Tronic is the third solo album by hip hop producer and rapper Black Milk, released on October 28, 2008 through Fat Beats Records. The album was produced by Black Milk, and features guest appearances from DJ Premier, Pharoahe Monch, Sean Price, Royce da 5'9" and Dwele. The album's lead single was "Give the Drummer Sum". This album is produced entirely by Black Milk except for "Without U" which is produced by Colin Munroe.

Track listing
"Long Story Short" 
Horns: Dwele
 Contains sample of "I Got Some" performed by Billy Garner
"Bounce"
"Give the Drummer Sum"
"Without U" (prod by Colin Munroe)
Featuring Colin Munroe
"Hold It Down"
Contains sample of "The Aircrash Bureau" performed by Gary Numan
"Losing Out"
Featuring Royce da 5'9"
Contains sample of "Let's Talk About Me" performed by The Alan Parsons Project
"Hell Yeah"
Featuring Fat Ray
"Overdose"
Contains sample of "W.O.L.V.E.S." performed by Krumbsnatcha feat. M.O.P.
Contains sample of "Language" performed by Suzanne Vega
"Reppin For U"
Featuring AB
Contains samples from "O Holy Night" performed by the Moog Machine's album Christmas Becomes Electric
"The Matrix"
Featuring Pharoahe Monch & Sean Price
Scratches: DJ Premier 
Contains sample of "Invisible Limits" performed by Tangerine Dream 
Contains sample of "Excuse Me Miss" performed by Jay-Z
Contains sample of "Real Hip Hop" performed by Das Efx
Contains sample of "Inspiration" performed by Da Ranjahz 
"Try"
Contains sample of "Who Do You Think You're Fooling" performed by The Symphonic Four
"Tronic Summer" [Instrumental]
"Bond 4 Life"
Featuring Melanie Rutherford
"Elec (Outro)" [Instrumental]
"Dub Rock" [iTunes Bonus Track]

Charts

References

External links 
The album at Fat Beats Records
Review at SofaKing Diligent
Review at Mind Inversion

2008 albums
Black Milk albums
Albums produced by Black Milk
Fat Beats Records albums